Michiels is a Dutch-language patronymic surname ("son of Michiel"). It may refer to:

Alexis Michiels (1883–1976), French cyclist
Andreas Victor Michiels (1797-1849), Dutch officer in the Dutch East Indies
Baudouin Michiels (born 1941), Belgian businessman
Diego Michiels (born 1990), Dutch-born Indonesian footballer
Edgar Michiels van Verduynen (1885–1952), Dutch baron and politician
Edmond Michiels (born 1913), Belgian water polo player
Githa Michiels (born 1983), Belgian cross-country cyclist
Ignace Michiels (born 1963), Belgian organist and choral conductor
Ivo Michiels (1923-2012), Belgian writer, pseudonym of Henri Ceuppens
Oscar Michiels (1881–1946), Belgian military officer
Paul Michiels (born 1948), Belgian singer and songwriter
Stani Michiels (born 1973), Belgian visual artist and architect
Yannick Michiels (born 1991), Belgian orienteer

See also
Sint-Michiels, a suburb of Bruges, Belgium

Surnames of Belgian origin
Dutch-language surnames
Patronymic surnames
Surnames from given names